Spodnja Lipnica is a village in the Municipality of Radovljica in the Upper Carniola region of Slovenia.

Name
The name Spodnja Lipnica literally means 'lower Lipnica', distinguishing the village from neighboring Zgornja Lipnica (literally, 'upper Lipnica'), which stands at an elevation  higher. The name Lipnica, like related names (e.g., Lipa, Lipnik, Lipovec, etc.), is derived from the Slovene common noun lipa 'linden', referring to the local vegetation.

Mass grave
Spodnja Lipnica is the site of a mass grave from the period immediately after the Second World War. It contained the remains of seven Slovene civilians from Radovljica that were murdered on May 29, 1945.

References

External links

Spodnja Lipnica at Geopedia

Populated places in the Municipality of Radovljica